KMAZ-LP (102.5 FM) is a radio station that is licensed to serve the inner Loop and Downtown areas of Houston, Texas, United States. The station broadcasts an urban adult contemporary format branded as "Amazing 102.5". KMAZ-LP broadcasts from the top of the Wells Fargo Building, 1000 Louisiana St., Houston TX, 77002. Its coverage area encompasses Downtown Houston, all Wards, The Heights, Montrose, West University, Rice Villages, and most of the areas located within the Interstate 610 Loop.

History
In January 2015, Bread of Life, Inc. was issued a construction permit for a LPFM radio facility on 102.5 MHz in downtown Houston.  The facility was granted a License to Cover on July 20, 2015, and began transmission on the same day. Under the facility's construction permit, the station was originally assigned the calls of KAYZ-LP, but were changed to the current KMAZ-LP prior to sign on.

External links
Official website

MAZ-LP
Urban adult contemporary radio stations in the United States
Radio stations established in 2015
2015 establishments in Texas
MAZ-LP